Taylor is an unincorporated community in Hardy County, West Virginia, United States. Taylor is located south of Moorefield on West Virginia Route 28/U.S. Route 220 between the South Branch Potomac and South Fork South Branch Potomac rivers.

References

Unincorporated communities in Hardy County, West Virginia
Populated places on the South Branch Potomac River
Unincorporated communities in West Virginia